The Old Courthouse, also known as the Buena Vista Land Company building, is a historic courthouse building located at Buena Vista, Virginia. It was built in 1890, and is a 2 1/2-story, brick building with a mansard roof in the Second Empire style. It originally housed the Treasurer's Office, Mayor's Office, Office of the Clerk of Court, the courtroom Attorney's offices, the telephone exchange, and the local Odd Fellow's Lodge.  The local public library has occupied the building since 1971, after a new municipal building was constructed.

It was listed on the National Register of Historic Places in 1979.  It is located in the Buena Vista Downtown Historic District.

Gallery

References

Courthouses in Virginia
Courthouses on the National Register of Historic Places in Virginia
Government buildings completed in 1890
Buildings and structures in Buena Vista, Virginia
National Register of Historic Places in Buena Vista, Virginia
Individually listed contributing properties to historic districts on the National Register in Virginia